National Secondary Route 137, or just Route 137 (or ) is a National Road Route of Costa Rica, located in the San José, Alajuela provinces.

Description
In San José province the route covers Puriscal canton (Santiago, Barbacoas, Grifo Alto districts), Turrubares canton (San Pablo, San Pedro, San Juan de Mata districts).

In Alajuela province the route covers Orotina canton (Orotina district).

References

Highways in Costa Rica